Danta may refer to:

Danta, Banaskantha, a town in Banaskantha district, Gujarat, India
Danta, Sikar, a village in Sikar district, Rajasthan, India
Danta people, an ethnic group in Ethiopia
Dàntǎ, Chinese for egg tart